Deni (born 26 July 1989) is an Indonesian weightlifter who competes in the 69 kg division. He placed 9th at the 2012 Olympics and 12th at the 2016 Olympics. He won gold medals at the 2011 Universiade and 2013 and 2017 Southeast Asian Games.

He represented Indonesia at the 2020 Summer Olympics in Tokyo, Japan. He competed in the men's 67 kg event.

References

Indonesian male weightlifters
Weightlifters at the 2012 Summer Olympics
Weightlifters at the 2016 Summer Olympics
Olympic weightlifters of Indonesia
1989 births
Living people
Weightlifters at the 2014 Asian Games
Universiade medalists in weightlifting
People from Bogor
Sportspeople from West Java
Southeast Asian Games gold medalists for Indonesia
Southeast Asian Games silver medalists for Indonesia
Southeast Asian Games medalists in weightlifting
Weightlifters at the 2018 Asian Games
Competitors at the 2011 Southeast Asian Games
Competitors at the 2013 Southeast Asian Games
Competitors at the 2017 Southeast Asian Games
Universiade gold medalists for Indonesia
Asian Games competitors for Indonesia
Medalists at the 2011 Summer Universiade
Islamic Solidarity Games medalists in weightlifting
Weightlifters at the 2020 Summer Olympics
21st-century Indonesian people